Sacred Heart Cathedral may refer to:

Africa
Sacred Heart Cathedral, Moundou, Chad
Sacred Heart Cathedral, Bamako, Mali
Sacred Heart Cathedral, Brazzaville, Republic of Congo
Sacred Heart Cathedral, Freetown, Sierra Leone
Sacred Heart Cathedral, Bloemfontein, South Africa
Sacred Heart Cathedral, Pretoria, South Africa
Sacred Heart Cathedral, Lomé, Togo
Sacred Heart Cathedral, Harare, Zimbabwe

Americas

Canada
Sacred Heart Cathedral (Bathurst, New Brunswick)
Sacred Heart Cathedral (Kamloops), British Columbia
Sacred Heart Cathedral (Prince George), Prince George, British Columbia

United States
(by state)
Sacred Heart Cathedral (Fairbanks, Alaska)
Sacred Heart Cathedral Preparatory, San Francisco, California
Cathedral of the Sacred Heart (Pueblo, Colorado), listed on the NRHP in Colorado
Cathedral of the Sacred Heart (Pensacola, Florida)
Sacred Heart Cathedral (Davenport, Iowa), listed on the NRHP in Iowa
Sacred Heart Cathedral (Dodge City, Kansas), listed on the NRHP in Kansas
Sacred Heart Cathedral (Salina, Kansas)
Sacred Heart Cathedral, Sacred Heart School and Christian Brothers Home, Duluth, Minnesota, listed on the NRHP in Minnesota
Cathedral of the Sacred Heart (Winona, Minnesota)
Cathedral Basilica of the Sacred Heart, Newark, New Jersey
Sacred Heart Cathedral (Gallup, New Mexico)
Sacred Heart Cathedral (Rochester, New York)
Sacred Heart Cathedral (Raleigh, North Carolina)
Cathedral of the Most Sacred Heart of Jesus (Knoxville, Tennessee)
Sacred Heart Cathedral (Amarillo, Texas)
Co-Cathedral of the Sacred Heart (Houston), Texas
Cathedral of the Sacred Heart (San Angelo, Texas)
Cathedral of the Sacred Heart (Richmond, Virginia), listed on the NRHP in Virginia
Basilica of the Co-Cathedral of the Sacred Heart (Charleston, West Virginia)

Elsewhere
Sacred Heart Cathedral, Petrolina, Brazil
Sacred Heart of Jesus Cathedral, Ecatepec, Mexico

Asia

China
Sacred Heart Cathedral (Guangzhou)
Sacred Heart Cathedral (Jinan)
Sacred Heart Cathedral (Xuzhou)
Sacred Heart Cathedral, Yangzhou

India
Cathedral of the Sacred Heart, Dibrugarh, Dibrugarh, Assam
Cathedral of the Sacred Heart, Asansol, Asansol, West Bengal
Sacred Heart Cathedral, Shimoga, Shimoga, Karnataka
Sacred Heart Cathedral, New Delhi
Sacred Heart Cathedral, Rourkela, Odisha
Sacred Heart Cathedral, Dharmapuri, Dharmapuri, Tamil Nadu
Sacred Heart Cathedral, Ootacamund, Ootacamund, Tamil Nadu
Sacred Heart Cathedral, Tanjore, Tanjore, Tamil Nadu
Sacred Heart Cathedral, Tuticorin, Tuticorin, Tamil Nadu
Sacred Heart Syro-Malabar Cathedral, Rajkot, Gujarat

Malaysia
Sacred Heart Cathedral, Kota Kinabalu, Malaysia
Sacred Heart Cathedral, Sibu, Malaysia

Elsewhere
Sacred Heart Cathedral, Maliana, East Timor
Sacred Heart Cathedral, Yokohama, Japan
Sacred Heart Cathedral, Mandalay, Myanmar
Sacred Heart Cathedral, Lahore, Pakistan

Europe
 Sacred Heart Cathedral, Sarajevo, Bosnia and Herzegovina
 Sacred Heart Cathedral, Rēzekne, Latvia

Oceania

Australia 
Sacred Heart Cathedral, Bendigo, Victoria,
Sacred Heart Cathedral, Townsville, Queensland

Elsewhere 
Sacred Heart Cathedral, Suva, Fiji
Sacred Heart Cathedral, Kiribati, Micronesia
Sacred Heart Cathedral, Wellington, New Zealand

See also
Sacré-Cœur, Paris
Sacred Heart (disambiguation)
Sacred Heart church (disambiguation)
Cathédrale du Sacré-Cœur (disambiguation)